Highway 281 (AR 281, Ark. 281, and Hwy. 281) is a state highway in Boone County, Arkansas. The route begins at Highway 7 near Bergman and runs north to Bull Shoals Lake. The route is maintained by the Arkansas Department of Transportation (ArDOT).

Route description
In Boone County, in the Ozark Mountains, Highway 281 begins at an intersection with Highway 7 north of Bergman. The route winds north through a sparsely populated area, passing through the unincorporated community of Boone. A brief concurrency with Highway 14 begins in northern Boone County. After the overlap, Highway 281 turns north and runs to Tucker Hollow Park on Bull Shoals Lake, where the route terminates.

History
The route was created by the Arkansas State Highway Commission on April 24, 1963 between Highway 14 and Bull Shoals Lake. It was extended south to Bergman on November 23, 1966.

Major intersections
Mile markers reset at concurrencies.

See also

 List of state highways in Arkansas

References

External links

281
Transportation in Boone County, Arkansas